Spyder is a 2017 Indian action thriller film written and directed by A. R. Murugadoss and produced by N. V. Prasad. It is filmed simultaneously in Telugu and Tamil, and stars Mahesh Babu, S.J. Suryah and Rakul Preet Singh. Murugadoss wrote the Tamil dialogues while the Paruchuri Brothers wrote the Telugu version. The film was edited by A. Sreekar Prasad, with cinematography by Santosh Sivan, and the music composed by Harris Jayaraj. The movie follows Shiva, an Intelligence Bureau officer, who sets out to save the people of Hyderabad when he realizes that a psychopath is on the loose.

This film marks the Tamil debut of Mahesh Babu, after a failed attempt for a simultaneous release in Tamil for Brahmotsavam (2016). Originally, the film was rumoured to be titled as Abhimanyudu and Sambhavami, before finalizing Spyder as the official title on 18 March 2017. The film began production in July 2016, followed by the commencement of the principal photography. Shooting mainly took place in Chennai, with some portions in and around Hyderabad and Vizag, while the songs were filmed overseas, before wrapping up in August 2017.

Spyder was released theatrically worldwide in Telugu, Tamil, Arabic and Malayalam on 27 September 2017 and was also released in US and Gulf countries on 26 September (a day before its release).   The film received mixed reviews from critics and audience who praised for its cast performances (particularly S. J. Surya and Mahesh Babu), action sequences and direction but criticism for its writing and pace. Though having grossed 120 crore - 150 crore against the budget of 120 crore, the film was a box office bomb due to the high production costs.

Plot
Shiva is an I.B. officer who spies on people's calls and messages to help them if needed. He developed a software to listen to the needy by tracking their phones. On the night of March 16, he listens to Charlie/Shalini talking about her wish on getting 98% in her exams from 96% to get a USA scholarship with her friend. In order to do that, she decides to go on a blind date with a guy believing it will help her concentrate on her studies. Shiva follows her and both start to fall for each other. However, he finds it hard to focus on his love life because of his job. On the night of 28 April, Shiva listens to a young girl asking her friend for help as she is alone in her house and scared, due to unavailability of electricity in her house, whilst everyone else on her street has the availability. 

Alarmed, Shiva sends his constable friend Renuka, to the girl's address as her aid. However, the next day, news headlines report about the gruesome death of the two women. Shiva visits the crime scene and resigns from the IB, due to guilt, but his father encourages him to find the killer. Shiva sets out to spy the girl's chats and whereabouts, where he finds out that a guy followed her at a café. Through Facebook, Shiva is able to track down another person who knew the stalker. With the provided information, he travels to the village where the stalker grew up and begins his search. From an elderly villager, Shiva finally learns about the man's past. Sudalai/Bhairavudu lived with his mother, father and a younger brother at a cemetery. 

Sudalai/Bhairavudu's father had to do funeral rites for the dead to feed his family, but this occupation leads to Sudalai/Bhairavudu suffering from S.P.D. and develops an unusual desire to kill victims and watch the victims's families grieving. One day, a village kid witness him killing someone, where he reveals this to the villagers. The infuriated mob decided to burn Sudalai/Bhairavudu's house, killing his parents. Enraged, Sudalai/Bhairavudu left the village to continue his killing spree along with his younger brother. After a roller coaster chase in Wonderla, Shiva catches Sudalai/Bhairavudu and interrogates him in a dense hideout, but learns that he is actually Sudalai/Bhairavudu's brother. Sudalai/Bhairavudu comes on Live (with a mask covered on his face) and reveals he killed 23 people and hid their corpse in 23 pillars of a metro bridge, and threatens the citizens to leave his brother unscathed and also reveals that he plans to destroy a hospital. 

Shiva kills Sudalai/Bhairavudu's brother in front of the 23 people's families, including an enraged Sudalai/Bhairavudu, who is hiding in the crowd. An upset Sudalai/Bhairavudu plans to kill Shiva's family, but Shiva finds out when his mother calls him and tells him she is scared because there is no electricity at their house whilst everyone else on the street does, exactly the same way as what the deceased girl had said earlier. With the help of his team members, Shiva is able to save his family; However, Shiva himself becomes Sudalai/Bhairavudu's next target, where he tries to kill Shiva on his way home, who is impaled on a truck. Shiva slowly recovers and resumes the search for Bhairavudu/Sudalai as he had shot him before he fell unconscious. Shiva deduces that Sudalai/Bhairavudu has hidden himself in a house where he can heal, but has imprisoned the owners. 

Through the use of technology and local ladies, Shiva finds Sudalai/Bhairavudu and arrests him, but Sudalai/Bhairavudu tells him that he had already planned a rock fall in the city. Shiva manages to stop the big rock whilst Sudalai/Bhairavudu escapes from police custody and continues with his plan to destroy a hospital. Charlie/Shalini learns about the targeted hospital, but refuses to tell Shiva due to a misunderstanding. Shiva tracks down her taxi, and she tells him about the hospital. Shiva rushes to the hospital and starts to evacuate the people inside, where he could save as many people as he could, but couldn't save some patients, which leaves him heartbroken. Sudalai/Bhairavudu sees Shiva's grieveness and becomes delighted. Shiva and Sudalai/Bhairavudu fight where Shiva overpowers and kills Sudalai/Bhairavudu and tells the media about the importance of helping others.

Cast

Production

Pre-production 
Originally, Mahesh Babu planned to make his direct debut in Tamil, after the dubbed Tamil version of Srimanthudu (2015), titled Selvandhan, received a decent response from audiences. He officially announced that his next film with Srikanth Addala titled Brahmotsavam (2016), and produced by PVP Cinema, will be a bilingual shot simultaneously in Telugu and Tamil with the same title. After opining that the script has the potential to be commercially successful in both the languages without making many changes, Mahesh accepted the proposal of a Telugu-Tamil bilingual. However, the plan was later dropped.

In November 2015, Mahesh Babu had announced for his next project directed by A. R. Murugadoss, which would be a Tamil-Telugu bilingual, marking Mahesh's first direct Tamil debut, as well as A. R. Murugadoss' return to Telugu cinema industry, a decade after his last film with the Chiranjeevi-starrer Stalin (2006).

Development 
The project was expected to kickstart the following year, with Santhosh Sivan, who worked with Murugadoss in Thuppakki (2012), will be the cinematographer, and Harris Jayaraj, who scored music for Murugadoss' earlier films, Ghajini, 7aum Arivu and Thuppakki.

It was reported that Mahesh Babu will play the role of a police officer in the film, although reports claimed that Mahesh will play the role of a RAW agent. The title of the film was also rumoured to be Abhimanyu. However, in December 2016, the makers announced the tentative title of the film as Sambhavami, which received mixed response from fans. On 18 March 2017, the film's title was revealed to be Spyder.

Casting 
In March 2016, Parineeti Chopra was initially signed to play the lead actress, making her debut in South Indian cinema. However, her non-availability of dates after she was finalised in the Sushant Singh Rajput-starrer Takadum (which was later shelved), meant that the creators approached Rakul Preet Singh in the leading role. S. J. Surya, was hired to play a negative role for the first time after featuring in lead roles, marking his second collaboration with Mahesh Babu after directing him in Naani (2004), although an actor this time. It is noted that Murugadoss was a former assistant of S. J. Surya in the films Vaali and Kushi. Tamil actor RJ Balaji, was signed in for the film, playing the role of Mahesh Babu's friend. In December 2016, Bharath was signed on to play a negative role.

Twin stunt choreographers Anbariv, were eventually roped in for the film to choreograph action sequences, although Peter Hein was roped in for the film. R. C. Kamalakannan, who supervised visual effects for Baahubali 2: The Conclusion (2017), was roped in as a part of the technical crew. Kamalakannan claimed that the film has heavy visual effects, and a Russian principal studio was working on the film. Nayanthara was initially claimed to do a crucial role in the film, although Murugadoss denied it.

Filming 
The film's principal photography commenced on 29 July 2016. Rakul Preet Singh joined the sets in August 2016, where the creators filmed a fresh schedule, focusing on the romantic scene between Rakul and Mahesh. The second schedule of the film, took place in mid-September 2016, in Pune and Bangalore, after the Chennai schedule was wrapped up. On 21 October 2016, Rakul Preet received a minor injury on her left hand, while shooting for an action episode. Although, the actress, who is advised to rest for a day, resumed shooting immediately. The third schedule of the film was kickstarted in Hyderabad in November 2016, with filming took place for three weeks. After wrapping up the shoot on 22 November, the team headed to Ahmedabad and Surat, for the fourth schedule. Mahesh extensively shot the schedule for two weeks. After a brief break, the makers resumed the shoot in Mumbai in January 2017, where the introductory scenes featuring Mahesh Babu, was being shot. During March 2017, Chiranjeevi made a visit to the sets of the film. More filming occurred in Vietnam between late March and early May. Some of the action scenes were shot there with local stunt artistes, such as the rollercoaster chase.

The final schedule of the film was expected to take place on 20 April 2017 in Hyderabad, although shooting started on 4 May 2017. Art director Rupin Suchak revealed to a source that 98% of the film was shot in Chennai, with the backdrop being changed to Hyderabad through computer graphics for the Telugu version. Mahesh did the film's stunts by himself without using body doubles. In some of the more intense scenes, he continued to perform his own stunts despite sustaining various injuries, leading to a physiotherapist being posted on set permanently for him, and eventually he "couldn’t get up for a week after the shooting schedule". On 16 May 2017, a source claimed that the makers planned for a climax sequence with high-octane action scenes, instead of a normal climax, which was originally scheduled to be shot at the NIMS Hospital in Bibnagar, Hyderabad, however, due to legal issues, the makers shifted the location to Chennai.

As of May 2017, the makers had completed the talkie portions of the film, and only two songs were pending, the makers had started the post-production works. The entire filming was about to be completed by 2 June 2017. But, the final schedule was helmed on 13 June 2017, where the talkie portions will be filmed, and it is considered to be a minor schedule, with shooting to last for only four days. In July 2017, the makers filmed a song sequence in Hyderabad for ten days. The last song of the film was shot abroad on 2 August, and the principal shoot was wrapped following its completion.

Music

The film's soundtrack is composed by Harris Jayaraj, with lyrics for the Tamil version was written by Madhan Karky. Initially, Karky, was expected to pen the songs for its Telugu-dubbed version, thus marking his debut in the Telugu industry, however, Ramajogayya Sastry penned the songs in Telugu. In late June 2017, Brijesh Shandilya recorded one song for the film, which is touted to be "ä desi romantic number". While the Tamil version of the soundtrack, features only five tracks. The Telugu version has a sixth track named as "Akkada Vunnavadu". The film features a lead single "Boom Boom" from the soundtrack album, which was released on 29 July 2017 in Tamil and Telugu. The full soundtrack album was launched on 25 August 2017, at Kalaivanar Arangam in Chennai. The album was also released in Telugu the same day.

Indiaglitz rated the album 3 out of 5, and summarised that "There is a strong Tamil flavour in all of the songs, with even traces of Harris' past works eminently noticeable." 123Telugu gave a positive verdict stating that "Spyder’s audio album attracts the class audience and stands as a different album in Mahesh’s career." Karthik Srinivasan of Milliblog stated that the album is "a predictable Harris Jayaraj package with two good-enough songs."

For the soundtrack of the Tamil version, Behindwoods rated the album 2.5 out of 5, saying, "Though there is nativity missing for Tamil listeners, the album has Harris' usual western style music with superior sounding." Sharanya CR from The Times of India reviewed that "Except for two songs, Harris doesn’t really up the magic quotient for SPYder." Moviecrow rated the album 3 out of 5 stating that "Harris Jayaraj delivers an engaging album filled with the composer’s signature sounds throughout the soundtrack." Siddharth Srinivas from Sify gave 3 out of 5 stating "Spyder is a lightweight, frothy soundtrack from Harris that's high on style but not too much on substance."

Telugu version

Tamil version

Release
During the film's pre-production phase, it was announced that the film releases on 23 June 2017. But the release was pushed to 10 August 2017, due to production delays. The film was postponed to mid-September and again to Dusherra, due to delay in the film's shooting. And, the makers finally announced that the film would be released on 27 September 2017. Following the huge reception for the Baahubali franchise, Spyder was also planned to have a simultaneous release in both Telugu and Tamil and also with a Malayalam-dubbed version with the same name. The film was sent to the Central Board of Film Certification for censor formalities on 19 September 2017, where the film received a "U/A" certification and with a runtime of 145 minutes.

Spyder was released in the United States, a day ahead of its release in Indian theatres on 26 September. The film was released in more than 800 screens in the country, thus becoming the widest release for a Telugu film after Baahubali 2: The Conclusion. The film was also speculated to have dubbed release in Arabic, and was scheduled to be released in the Gulf countries. Hein bought the Vietnamese dubbing rights of the film and released it in Vietnam.

Distribution 
The Tamil Nadu theatrical rights for the film were acquired by Lyca Productions for 18 crore. Andhra Pradesh and Telangana distribution rights were secured by the production house itself, except for the Nizam rights which were acquired by Dil Raju for 24 crore. The overseas distribution rights were sold to Atmus Entertainment for 22.5 crore. The ceded rights were sold for 12 crore and Vizag rights were sold for 8.1 crore. The film earned 6 crore in the East and 4.5 crore in the West, 5.4 crore in Krishna, 7.2 crore in Guntur and 3.2 crore in Nellore, for a total of 70.4 crore from the Telugu States. The film's Karnataka theatrical rights were sold to Goldie Films for 10.8 crore Kerala theatrical rights were sold for ₹1.3 crore and Rest Of India rights were sold for 1 crore. The film earned 124 crore from worldwide theatricals alone, including satellite rights for Telugu & Hindi Version were sold for ₹25 crore and for Tamil & Malayalam Version were sold for ₹6.5 crore and audio rights were sold for ₹1.5 crore, the film made a business of 157 crore, before its release.

Marketing 
The film's first poster was initially scheduled to release on 29 March 2017, but was eventually released on 12 April 2017. The poster gives us a glimpse of a buff and ripped Mahesh Babu with a gun in his hand. The poster received an overwhelming response from fans. The team launched an official Facebook and Twitter page and an official YouTube channel for the film's promotions. Initially, the makers wanted to release the first glimpse of the film on 31 May 2017, coinciding with actor Krishna's birthday, the father of Mahesh. But it was postponed due to the demise of veteran filmmaker Dasari Narayana Rao. The teaser was launched on 1 June at midnight to positive reviews from fans.

On 9 August 2017, the makers released the official teaser of the film coinciding with the actor's birthday. The teaser crossed 8.6 million views within 48 hours of its release. The official trailer of the film was released on 15 September 2017, during the pre-release event held at Shilpakala Vedika in Hyderabad. The trailer received outstanding reviews, and it crossed 2 million views within a few hours. Before the release of the film, Mahesh Babu revealed that the robotic spider featured in the film's teaser, will not feature in the film as it has no role for it. Mahesh announced it, that he doesn't want his fans to be disappointed.

Home media 
The satellite rights of the film were acquired by Zee Network (for Telugu and Hindi versions) and Sun TV Network (for Tamil and Malayalam versions) for a record sum of 30.5 crore. The film's Telugu version was premiered in Zee Telugu on 14 January 2018, coinciding with Sankranthi, and registered a TRP rating of 6.7. The film's television premiere took place on 18 February 2018. The film was also dubbed in Hindi and directly premiered on Zee Cinema on 17 June 2018.

Reception

Critical reception

Tamil version 
M. Suganth of The Times of India rated 2 out of 5, stating that "The writing lets Spyder down entirely after a point and, unlike Thuppakki (which was also about a man trying to save and a man trying to destroy), what should have been an edge-of-the-seat cat-and-mouse game between good and evil turns into a movie that cannot decide between wanting to be a crackling thriller and an anything-goes masala movie." S. Srivatsan of India Today rated 2 out of 5, and summarised it as "The core of Spyder seems to have been written for Telugu audience. Even for them, Spyder isn't a satisfying star vehicle. Or Maybe Spyder isn't what Murugadoss imagined on paper. Because, some scenes, even on paper, appear to be pompous. Consider the scene from the second half of 7am Arivu and you'll understand better."

Behindwoods rated the film 2.5 out of 5 and stated that "SJ Suryah's performance and AR Murugadoss' touch makes Spyder a decent thriller." Indiaglitz rated the film 2.5 out of 5 and stated "Watch SPYder for Mahesh's genuine efforts and SJ Surya’s gritty performance. If you are looking for a fitting duel between the hero and villain you might get disappointed for the film shines only on their respective characters and is let down when it comes to their duel." Moviecrow gave 3 out of 5 and stated, "This is AR Murugadoss signature style movie with Superhero template without the hero having super powers. This is probably the best launch Mahesh Babu could have asked for. In return, Tamil audience will embrace Mahesh Babu."

International Business Times rated 3 out of 5 and stated that "Spyder stands out as an enjoyable entertainer despite its flaws." Baradwaj Rangan of Film Companion called "this film is a pretty decent god-vs-demon tale, with a solid hero and a spectacular villain" in his review. Subhash K. Jha of NDTV, gave 4 out of 5 and stated, "Murugadoss takes a familiar bad-guy-good-guy plot and converts it into a compelling cat-and-mouse game shot in colours and favours that suggest life in times of impending death."

Telugu version 
Sridhar Adivi from The Times of India rated the film 2.5 out of 5, stating, "The conflict between the hero and the villain seems like a safe enough plot for a potboiler or a spy film; however, Murugadoss’ writing doesn't manage to give you the chills or thrills the promos promised to." Behindwoods rated the film 2.75 out of 5, and stated that "Beyond a point, the film gets a little too heavy with gore, and one might feel the climax could have been executed better. Apart from these minor issues, Spyder will entertain you if you are an action film lover." Y. Sunita Chowdary of The Hindu stated that "Spyder starts off well but the director’s imagination goes overboard only to turn a purpose ridden plot to a piece of travesty." Indiaglitz gave the film 2.75 out of 5 stating "The spy thriller takes unconvincing liberties in the second half.  A tragedy of epic proportions is sought to be reduced into a hero vs villain rivalry without a compelling narrative."

In a positive note, 123Telugu rated it 3.25 out of 5, and summarised that "On the whole, Spyder is a decent action thriller which has some very interesting moments." Sify gave the film a rating of 2.75 out of 5 stating "Spyder has some riveting moments in the first half, the face-off between Mahesh Babu and S J Surya reeks of brilliance but it turns monotonous in the second half." Hemanth Kumar of Firstpost gave the film 3.5 out of 5, stating "Spyder is also a true blue action thriller and it stays true to the genre. This isn’t a Mahesh Babu’s film alone and it doesn’t pander to our expectations from his action dramas. And to see him step into the shoes of a character which doesn’t dominate the film is also why Spyder has a very different tone from the very beginning." Karthik Keramalu of Hindustan Times gave 2 out of 5 and stated: "Spyder is not great but it’s definitely watchable for Mahesh Babu, Suryah and the touching humanistic angle."

Box-office 
On its opening day, the film saw more than 95% occupancy in theatres and managed to collect 51 crore gross on its first day at global box-office. The film grossed 23.4 crore on the first day of its release, with a share of 15.3 crore in Andhra Pradesh and Telangana and it is said to have collected 1.30 crore in two days in Chennai alone. The film had crossed 85 crore within three days, and it collected 110 crore within five days. In twelve days it collected 150 crore gross at global box-office. At the US Box office the film collected 1.5 million in seven days, becoming the fifth film of the actor to do so. The film was considered as a financial disappointment, due to the high production costs involved.

See also 
 List of multilingual Indian films
 Pan-Indian film
 List of longest films in India

Notes

References

External links 

 
 

2010s Tamil-language films
2010s Telugu-language films
2017 films
Indian multilingual films
Indian action thriller films
Films scored by Harris Jayaraj
Films directed by AR Murugadoss
Intelligence Bureau (India) in fiction
Films shot in Hyderabad, India
Films set in Hyderabad, India
Films shot in Chennai
Films shot at Ramoji Film City
Films about computing
Techno-thriller films
Films about security and surveillance
Films about terrorism in India
Films shot in Gujarat
Fictional portrayals of the Telangana Police
Films set in hospitals
Films about murder
Films shot in Romania
Films about mass murder
Reliance Entertainment films
2017 action thriller films
2017 multilingual films